Clarity Haynes is a queer feminist American artist and writer. She currently lives and works in New York, NY. Haynes is best known for her unconventional painted portraits of torsos, focusing on queer, trans, cis female and nonbinary bodies. She is a former member of the tART Collective and the Corpus VI Collective.

Education 
Haynes holds a BA in Film from Temple University, a CFA in Painting from the Pennsylvania Academy of the Fine Arts, and an MFA in Painting from Brooklyn College.

Work 
Haynes' work focuses heavily on the human body, she believes the moles, wrinkles, stretch marks, veins and such on our bodies are landmarks of our journey through our lives. Her themes often include aging, illness, and mortality. Her work pushes the social conventions of beauty, femininity, as well as gender and sexuality.

Haynes’ most controversial work is The Breast Portrait Project, portraying the nude female torso complete with wrinkles and blemishes, in the opposite style from a glamour portrait. The absence of a face compels the viewer to detect character and personality from these less-familiar indicators. This project initially began with a self portrait of her own torso in order to confront her own image issues. After feeling empowered by the portrait, Haynes began doing more of these portraits for friends and soon for complete strangers at festivals. Clarity explains: “I am interested in the many ways the body changes throughout a lifetime, and in the ways in which we create and change our bodies.” She even kept record and pictures of each sitter in handmade books for the project full of the women she painted to help heal just like she had. This project was popular with the LGBTQ and feminist communities of the 90s.

Exhibitions 
Haynes has had solo exhibitions at Brandeis University's Kniznick Gallery, Payne Gallery at Moravian College, Stout Projects, Bogigian Gallery at Wilson College, and Artists' House Gallery. Her work was included in The Outwin 2016: American Portraiture Today at the National Portrait Gallery, which traveled to the Kemper Museum of Contemporary Art, the Tacoma Art Museum, the Ackland Art Museum and the Art Museum of South Texas. She has participated in many group exhibitions, including at the Marjorie Barrick Museum of Art, Pennsylvania Academy of the Fine Arts,  Rutgers University's Paul Robeson Galleries, Invisible-Exports Gallery, Mana Contemporary, and the Leslie-Lohman Museum of Gay and Lesbian Art.

Recognition 
Haynes has received numerous awards, including a Pollock-Krasner Foundation award, a New York Foundation for the Arts Fellowship in Painting, a MacDowell Fellowship, a Brooklyn Arts Council/New York City Department of Cultural Affairs Community Regrant Award, a Leeway Foundation Window of Opportunity Grant, and a Barbara Deming Memorial Fund Grant.Haynes' work has been discussed in many publications, including the Washington Post, Hyperallergic, Two Coats of Paint, Juxtapoz Magazine, Beautiful Decay Magazine, and the Huffington Post, among others. Her work is included in The Body: Social and Cultural Dissections, Routledge, and Living Out Loud: An Introduction to LGBTQ History, Society, and Culture, Routledge. Her work was featured in Sinister Wisdom's July 2016 issue, Variations. Haynes' work is in the collections of the Leslie-Lohman Museum of Gay and Lesbian Art, the Pennsylvania Academy of the Fine Arts, the Marjorie Barrick Museum of Art, and the Rena Rowan Breast Cancer Center at the University of Pennsylvania Hospital. Her work is included in the Brooklyn Museum's Feminist Art Base, a digital archive.

Censorship 
Haynes' work is frequently censored on social media. She has written about her experience with censorship, and chaired a panel on the subject at the College Art Association Conference in 2019.

Writing 
Haynes' writing has appeared in Hyperallergic, Two Coats of Paint,  The Brooklyn Rail, ARTnews, and other publications.

Selected writings 

 Haynes, Clarity. "Going Beneath the Surface: For 50 Years, Harmony Hammond's Art and Activism Has Championed Queer Women" ARTnews, June 2019
Haynes, Clarity. "I'm a Queer Feminist Artist. Why Are My Paintings Censored on Social Media?" Hyperallergic, March 2018
 Haynes, Clarity. "'You Have to Get Past the Fear': Joan Semmel on Painting her Aged, Nude Body" Hyperallergic, September 2016
Haynes, Clarity. "How We Got Here: Portrait of the Artist as a Queer Feminist" Hyperallergic, March 2015

References

External links 

 Official website
Kossak Lecture at Hunter College

American women painters
American contemporary painters
Feminist artists
Living people
1971 births
Pennsylvania Academy of the Fine Arts alumni
20th-century American painters
21st-century American painters
20th-century American women artists
21st-century American women artists
Art writers
Queer artists
American art writers
American portrait painters
Queer feminists
Brooklyn College alumni
21st-century American LGBT people
American lesbian artists